A recognition signal is a signal whereby a person, a ship, an airplane or something else is recognized. They can be used during war or can be used to help the police recognize each other during undercover operations. It can also be used in biology to signal that a molecule or chemical is to be bound to another molecule.

War
These signals are often used to recognize friends and enemies in a war. For military use these signals often use colored lights or the International marine signal flags

Police
Other uses of the signal include the police who sometimes use a recognition signal so that officers in uniform can recognize officers in normal clothing (undercover). The NYPD often use headbands, wristbands or colored clothing as recognition signals which are known as the "color of the day".

Biology
A recognition signal is also a chemical signal used in biology to signal the end of a section of DNA or RNA during gene duplication in cells.

See also
Communication
International Code of Signals

Notes

External links

 Signalman manual

Communication
Biological techniques and tools
Military communications

References